Everybody's Equal is a game show that originally aired on ITV from 7 June 1989 to 22 July 1991 and hosted by Chris Tarrant. It was later revived under the name Whittle and aired on Channel 5 from 31 March to 30 December 1997 with Tim Vine as host. Versions also existed in many European countries, plus Canada. Elements of the show resemble Tarrant's future hit Who Wants to be a Millionaire?, particularly its "Fastest Finger First" game; in addition, the US-based mobile game HQ Trivia.

Format
200 contestants were asked a question with four options and those who got it right were asked another. This continued until fewer than ten players survived, at which point they face four questions which were worth £50 each. If more than ten players remained after the sixth question, the ten fastest players went through. The player who correctly answered the final question the fastest went on to play the final round. The winning contestant was to place four things into the correct order, to win £1,000. If they got it wrong, the money was divided equally between all the other contestants.

On the original version of the show, Chris Tarrant would routinely "name and shame" the contestants who voted for the most outlandish answers - most memorably the first game of the first show where all but one contestant voted for the correct answer.

In the revival, likely due to lower budgets, the main prize is £250 or £500, depending if the contestant wanted to take on the offer. This time if one of the ten remaining contestants were out of the game, they would have to wear a “Whittle Mask”, which consists of a purple "W" from the show's logo graphic on a yellow disc with eye holes to see out of.

Transmissions

ITV

Channel 5

International versions

References

External links

1989 British television series debuts
1997 British television series endings
1980s British game shows
1990s British game shows
British television series revived after cancellation
Channel 5 (British TV channel) original programming
English-language television shows
ITV game shows
Television shows produced by Thames Television
Television series by Reg Grundy Productions
Television series by Fremantle (company)